Mānuka honey is a monofloral honey produced from the nectar of the mānuka tree, Leptospermum scoparium. The mānuka tree is indigenous to New Zealand and some parts of coastal Australia, but is today produced globally. Used as a sugar substitute, it has a strong, earthy aroma and flavour. There is little clinical evidence for its use as a topical medication. The word mānuka is the Māori name of the tree; however, as with many Māori words, the older spelling manuka (without a macron) remains relatively common in English.

Identification
Mānuka honey is produced by European honey bees (Apis mellifera) foraging on the mānuka (Leptospermum scoparium), which evidence suggests originated in Australia before the onset of the Miocene aridity. It grows uncultivated throughout both southeastern Australia and New Zealand.

Mānuka honey is markedly viscous. This property is due to the presence of a protein or colloid and is its main visually defining character, along with its typical dark cream to dark brown colour.

The mānuka tree flowers at the same time as Kunzea ericoides, another Myrtaceae species also called kānuka, which often shares the same growing areas. Some apiarists cannot readily differentiate these species, as both flowers have similar morphology and pollen differentiation between the two species is difficult.

Mānuka honey for export from New Zealand must be independently tested. The country's Ministry for Primary Industries has developed a government standard called the Mānuka Honey Science Definition test to identify that all mānuka honey is pure when it leaves the country. The test comprises five attributes, four of which are chemical, and one of which is DNA of Leptospermum scoparium. The honey must pass all five tests to be labeled as pure New Zealand mānuka. This testing came into effect on 5 January 2018. Independent quality and rating organisation, the UMF Honey Association then certifies four quality factors for honey harvested, packed and sealed in New Zealand.   

The UMF Honey Association was originally known as the Active Manuka Honey Association (AMHA), and was formed in 2002. In 2011, the AMHA became The Unique Manuka Factor Honey Association (UMFHA). The Australian Manuka Honey Association (AMHA) was established in 2017 following the discontinuation of the New Zealand Manuka Honey industry's change of the use of the acronym AMHA. They established a set of standards for authentic Australian Manuka honey.  Honey that carries the AMHA's Mark of Authenticity must be pure, natural Manuka honey, produced entirely in Australia, and be tested by an independent, approved laboratory to ensure it meets minimum standards of naturally occurring methylglyoxal, dihydroxyacetone, and leptosperin.

Uses

Food 
Mānuka honey has a strong flavour, characterised as "earthy, oily, herbaceous", and "florid, rich and complex". It is described by the New Zealand honey industry as having a "damp earth, heather, aromatic" aroma and a "mineral, slightly bitter" flavour.

Research

Methylglyoxal, a component of mānuka honey, is under study for its potential activity against E. coli and S. aureus. Mānuka honey does not reduce the risk of infection following treatment for ingrown toenails.

Controversy

Grading, counterfeit and adulteration
As a result of the high premium paid for mānuka honey, an increasing number of products now labeled as such worldwide are adulterated or counterfeit. In governmental agency tests in the UK between 2011 and 2013, a majority of mānuka-labeled honeys sampled lacked the non-peroxide anti-microbial activity of mānuka honey. Likewise, of 73 samples tested by UMFHA in Britain, China and Singapore in 2012–13, 43 tested negative. Separate UMFHA tests in Hong Kong found that 14 out of 56 mānuka honeys sampled had been adulterated with syrup. In 2013, the UK Food Standards Agency asked trading standards authorities to alert mānuka honey vendors to the need for legal compliance.

The UMFHA trademarked a honey rating system called Unique Mānuka Factor, but there is a confusing range of competing rating systems for mānuka honeys. In one UK chain in 2013, two products were labeled "12+ active" and "30+ total activity" respectively for "naturally occurring peroxide activity", and another "active 12+" for "total phenol activity", yet none of the three were labeled for the strength of the non-peroxide antimicrobial activity specific to mānuka honey.

Criminal activity associated with production
There have been increasing turf disputes between producers operating close to large mānuka tree clumps, and also cases reported of many hives being variously sabotaged, poisoned, or stolen.

See also
Apitherapy
Beekeeping in New Zealand
Beekeeping in Australia

References

Australian cuisine
New Zealand cuisine
Honey
Food and drink in New Zealand